Pekka Tuokkola (born October 22, 1983) is a Finnish former professional ice hockey goaltender currently signed with IK Kronan, Kronoby.

Career 
He has previously played in his native Finland with Tappara, JYP and KalPa in the Finnish Liiga. Tuokkola made his SM-liiga debut playing with Tappara during the 2004–05 season. He won the Finnish national championship with JYP in 2009 and received the Jari Kurri Trophy as Playoff MVP.

On May 21, 2014, Tuokkola as a free agent agreed to an optional two-year contract with Austrian club, EC KAC of the EBEL. He left the Klagenfurt-based club following the 2015-16 season, returning to JYP.

References

External links

1983 births
Living people
Färjestad BK players
Finnish expatriate ice hockey players in Austria
Finnish expatriate ice hockey players in Italy
Finnish expatriate ice hockey players in Russia
Finnish expatriate ice hockey players in Sweden
Finnish ice hockey goaltenders
Hokki players
JYP Jyväskylä players
KalPa players
Kiekko-Vantaa players
EC KAC players
People from Alavus
SaPKo players
Tappara players
Torpedo Nizhny Novgorod players
Sportspeople from South Ostrobothnia